Gordon Shepherd may refer to:

Gordon Shepherd (football chairman) (born 1935), current chairman of Barnsley F.C.
Gordon G. Shepherd, Canadian space scientist
Gordon M. Shepherd (born 1933), Yale University professor of neuroscience and neurobiology

See also
 Gordon Strachey Shephard (1885–1918), British Royal Flying Corps commander and sailor